Chipman, a surname, may refer to:

People

 Ben Chipman, American politician
 Bob Chipman (1918–1973), American baseball player
 Bob Chipman (basketball) (born 1951), American basketball coach
 Dana K. Chipman (born 1958), former Judge Advocate General of the United States Army
 Daniel Chipman (1765–1850), American politician
 David Chipman, American former law-enforcement officer and gun control advocate
 Elizabeth Chipman (born 1934), Australian writer and Antarctic pioneer
 Foster Samuel Chipman (born 1829), American politician
 Frank Cupman (born 1947), Canadian politician
 George Fisher Chipman (1882–1935), Canadian journalist
 Henry C. Chipman (1784–1867), American judge
 Jared Ingersol Chipman (1788–1832), Nova Scotian lawyer, judge and politician
 John Chipman (disambiguation)
 Leverett de Veber Chipman (1831–1914), Canadian politician
 Mark Chipman (born 1960), Canadian businessman and sports executive
 Nathaniel Chipman (1752–1843), American judge and politician
 Norton P. Chipman (1834-1924), American army officer and politician
 Roy Chipman (–1997), American basketball coach
 Samuel Chipman (1790–1891), Nova Scotian politician
 Samuel B. Chipman (1703–1855), Nova Scotian politician
 Stephen L. Chipman (1864–1945), American politician and Mormon missionary
 W. R. Chipman (born 1863), American politician
 Ward Chipman (1754–1824), Chief Justice of New Brunswick
 Ward Chipman Jr. (1787–1851), New Brunswick lawyer, judge and politician 
 William Chipman (disambiguation)

Places
 Chipman, Alberta
 Chipman Airport (Alberta)
 Chipman, New Brunswick
 Chipman Airport (New Brunswick)
 Chipman Parish, New Brunswick

See also 
 Chipman Creek (disambiguation)